David Harvey (born 20 May 1982) is a Brazilian rugby player. He has played in the Super Rugby for the Western Force and for several clubs around the world in England, France, Italy and Australia.

Rugby career
Harvey played for the Western Force in Super Rugby, making his debut for in round four of the 2012 season against the Waratahs in Sydney. Harvey previously played for French side Narbonne and English teams such as Coventry, Newbury and Bradford & Bingley.

International career
Harvey, born in Australia, was eligible to represent Australia, both by birth and by residency grounds, and Brazil via his mother, who is Brazilian. In 2015, Harvey was selected to represent Brazil against Germany. Harvey scored twelve points in the match. Brazil lost 12–29.

External links
Western Force profile
itsrugby.co.uk profile

Living people
1982 births
Australian rugby union players
Australian people of Brazilian descent
Bradford RFC players
Brazilian rugby union players
Brazilian people of Australian descent
Rugby union fly-halves
Western Force players
Greater Sydney Rams players
New South Wales Country Eagles players
Amatori Rugby Milano players
Rugby union players from Brisbane
Australian expatriate rugby union players
Australian expatriate sportspeople in France
Australian expatriate sportspeople in England
Expatriate rugby union players in France
Brazilian rugby sevens players
Brazil international rugby union players
Australian expatriate sportspeople in Italy
RC Narbonne players
Expatriate rugby union players in Italy
Expatriate rugby union players in England